Milap is a 1972 Bollywood action film directed by B. R. Ishara. The film stars Shatrughan Sinha, Reena Roy and Danny Denzongpa in lead roles.

Cast
 Shatrughan Sinha as Ravi / Raju 
 Reena Roy as Rani Chalava / Rukmani 
 Danny Denzongpa as Raju 
 Manmohan Krishna as Judge 
 Fazlu as Raghunath  
 Sarita as Radha

Soundtrack

Music
The film has a popular song "Kai Sadiyon Se, Kai Janmo Se" sung by Mukesh.

References

External links
 

1972 films
1970s Hindi-language films
1970s action films
Films directed by B. R. Ishara